Luis Alberto Bonnet (born 27 April 1971) is a former Argentine-Peruvian football striker.

External links
 delgol website

1971 births
Living people
Argentine people of French descent
Footballers from Buenos Aires
Argentine footballers
Peruvian footballers
Peruvian Primera División players
Club Atlético Atlanta footballers
Sporting Cristal footballers
Cienciano footballers
Gimnasia y Tiro footballers
Expatriate footballers in Argentina
Expatriate footballers in Peru
Argentine emigrants to Peru
Association football forwards